Joseph J. Brady was an American amateur soccer player who competed in the 1904 Summer Olympics. He was a member of the St. Rose Parish team, which won the bronze medal in the soccer tournament. He played in three of the four matches.

References

External links
Olympic profile

American soccer players
Footballers at the 1904 Summer Olympics
Olympic bronze medalists for the United States in soccer
Year of death missing
Year of birth missing
Association football midfielders
Medalists at the 1904 Summer Olympics